Gordonia amicalis is a dibenzothiophene-desulphurizing actinomycete with type strain IEGMT (= DSM 44461T = KCTC 9899T).

References

Further reading

Jackisch-Matsuura, Ani Beatriz, et al. "Production and characterization of surface-active compounds from Gordonia amicalis." Brazilian Archives of Biology and Technology 57.1 (2014): 138–144.
Kilbane II, John J., and John Robbins. "Characterization of the dszABC genes of Gordonia amicalis F. 5.25. 8 and identification of conserved protein and DNA sequences." Applied Microbiology and Biotechnology 75.4 (2007): 843–851.

External links
LPSN

Type strain of Gordonia amicalis at BacDive -  the Bacterial Diversity Metadatabase

Mycobacteriales
Bacteria described in 2000